Looking for Saint Tropez is the debut studio album of Belgian electronic band Telex, released in 1979.

Track listings

Original

Bonus tracks

Japan (CD #ALCA-557, Alfa Records) (1994)

France (CD #LM54070, Le Maquis) (2003)

Charts

References

External links
 TELEX-MUSIC.COM
 TELEX – Looking For Saint Tropez - Discogs
 
 
 
 Hidden treasures: Telex – Looking for Saint Tropez | Music | theguardian.com

1979 debut albums
Telex (band) albums
Sire Records albums
Disques Vogue albums
King Records (Japan) albums